Water is the third album of American rock band Saigon Kick, released on September 28, 1993 through Third Stone/Atlantic. It is the first Saigon Kick album to feature guitarist Jason Bieler on lead vocals, and bassist Chris McLernon. Drummer Phil Varone left the band in the same year.

Release
As the follow-up album to The Lizard, Saigon Kick dropped from a four- to a three-piece, with guitarist Jason Bieler taking over the vocal chores from the departed Matt Kramer (they initially had a vocal styling of Alice in Chains arrangement, with Bieler singing many vocal parts and harmonies before this, so it did not sound drastically different with the exception of the fact Bieler was now singing lead vocals). Also at this time, bassist Tom DeFile left and was replaced by Chris McLernon. Musical differences’ got in the way of the third Saigon Kick album, so vocalist Kramer and bassist Defile departed. Leaving Bieler to take over on vocals, who wrote all the songs (except "Space Oddity" a cover of a David Bowie song) as well as produced.

Critical reception

Billboard gave the single "I Love You" a mixed review, writing "only a crisp guitar solo midway through the song saves it from Hallmark oblivion."  While originally planned to be promoted to both Contemporary Hit Radio and Album Rock radio, the record label pivoted and promoted the track "One Step Closer" to the rock stations shortly thereafter. "I Love You" was added to 34 Radio & Records Contemporary stations, but did not chart on the Billboard Hot 100.

Track listing

Personnel

Saigon Kick
 Phil Varone – drums, cover concept
 Jason Bieler – vocals, guitar, piano, keyboard, bass, programming, production, cover concept
 Chris McLernon – bass, backing vocals, guitar, cover concept

Additional musicians
 Basil Rodriguez – string arrangement (track number 13), trumpet (11)
 Richard Drexler – piano (13)
 RMM Community Choir – choir (3)
 Keith Jacobs – RMM Community Choir director (3)

Technical personnel
 Ronny Lahti – engineering, mixing, additional backing vocals (5, 6)
 Tom Morris – assistant engineering
 Jim Morris – assistant engineering
 Mike Fuller – mastering
 Sheila Rock – photography
 Allen Hori – art direction
 Richard Bates – art direction
 Derek Oliver – 2018 reissue liner notes

References 

1993 albums
Saigon Kick albums
Atlantic Records albums
Albums recorded at Morrisound Recording